Samuel Abraham Goldblith (May 5, 1919 – December 28, 2001) was an American food scientist. While involved in World War II, he studied malnutrition, and later was involved in food research important for space exploration.

Early life
A native of Lawrence, Massachusetts, Goldblith was the son of a Russian immigrant. He received his S.B. in biology from the Massachusetts Institute of Technology (MIT) in 1940. During his student days, he was also involved in Reserve Officers' Training Corps, and began serving with the United States Army Corps of Engineers as a Second Lieutenant in the Philippines.

World War II and POW
While in the Philippines, Goldblith would be part of the US Army contingent involved in the Battle of the Philippines and captured by the Japanese following the Battle of Corregidor. Having been surrendered on Corregidor, Goldblith avoided the Bataan Death March and Camp O'Donnell, being sent instead to one of the Cabanatuan POW camps. In November 1942 he endured a trip aboard the "hell ship", Nagato Maru, to Japan.

Despite being a POW, Goldblith was able to conduct scientific research, even studying malnutrition and related diseases affecting those around him. His knowledge of botany and chemistry would save the lives of many of his fellow soldiers while a POW. These studies included beriberi, hypoproteinemia, and Vitamin A deficiencies. Goldblith was able to use iodine from his medical kit to dose the foul water in his canteen in an effort to prevent dysentery. His research would be published in the journal Science in September 1946 and in the Office of Naval Research Reports in 1947.

Goldblith would earn two Bronze Stars and one Silver Star for his service and be discharged as a Captain in 1946. In later years, Goldblith and his wife, the former Diana Greenberg, would remain in close contact with the Belgian Catholic nuns in the Philippines who were instrumental in saving the lives of so many lives with their food and medical supplies during the war.

Return to MIT
Upon his discharge from the US Army, Goldblith would return to MIT where he would earn his S.M. in 1947 and his Ph.D. in 1949, both in food technology. He would join the food technology faculty at MIT in 1949, rising to the rank of professor in 1959. Goldblith would serve as acting department chair following Bernard E. Proctor's death in 1959 and remained in that position until Nevin Scrimshaw took over as department chair in 1961. Goldblith would remain as professor until 1974 when he became MIT's director of the Industrial Liaison Program (ILP), a position he would hold until 1978. After that, Goldblith would be promoted to MIT's vice president of resource development until 1986, then promoted again to Senior advisor to the President of MIT, where he would retire in 1992.

Research at MIT
During his service at MIT, Goldblith led the development of food irradiation, of freeze-drying and microwave technology, all of which would prove important for the Space Race. This included Project Mercury, Project Gemini, and Project Apollo, but would later stretch to Skylab, the Space Shuttle, and even to the International Space Station.

The first graduate student that Goldblith worked with was Yiachi Aikawa from Japan. Goldblith's work with Aikawa would both develop a lifelong friendship and allow Goldblith to heal from the emotional wounds he suffered as a POW from World War II. Aikawa would later create TechnoVenture Co., Ltd., the first venture capital firm in Japan. He was also the son of Yoshisuke Aikawa, the founder of Nissan Motors. Their relationship would lead to the opening of the MIT Japan office in 1976 as well. It would also earn Goldblith the Second Grade of the Order of the Sacred Treasure in 1984 for his efforts in strengthening Japanese-American relationships, only the second non-Japanese to do so at that time.

Goldblith authored over 250 articles in scientific journals and edited or co-edited six books in food science and technology. He would also author three additional books on the history of MIT, including his 1996 autobiography Appetite for Life.

Awards and honors
Institute of Food Technologists (IFT) Babcock-Hart Award - 1969.
IFT Nicholas Appert Award - 1970.
IFT Fellow - 1970, among the first class of 27 fellows inducted.
Underwood-Prescott Professorship: 1972–1978.
Foreign Member of the Royal Swedish Academy of Engineering Sciences (1980).

Personal life
Golblith married Diana Greenberg in 1941 and they would remain married until her death in 1990. They would produce two sons (Errol (died 1963) and Jonathan), one daughter (Judith), and two granddaughters (Sarah and Rachel).

Death and legacy
Goldblith died on December 28, 2001, in Peabody, Massachusetts. A memorial service was held at MIT on May 28, 2002, to honor Goldblith. MIT established the Samuel A. Goldblith Career Development Chair in 1993, partially funded by Aikawa's family. This chair has been held by Peter Dedon (Toxicology), James L. Sherley (Bioengineering), and since 2006, Stuart Licht (Chemistry).

Selected works
Goldblith, S.A. (1996). Appetite for Life: An Autobiography. Trumball, CT: Food & Nutrition Press. 
Goldblith, S.A. (2004). "Dr. Bernard E. Proctor." In Pioneers in Food Science, Volume 2. J.J. Powers, Ed. Trumball, CT: Food & Nutrition Press.
Goldblith, S.A. (1946). "Japanese Scientists and the POW's." Science. 27 September: 302–303.
Goldblith, S.A. (1995). Of Microbes and Molecules: Food Technology, Nutrition, and Applied Biology at M.I.T., 1873-1988. Trumball, CT: Food & Nutrition Press.
Goldbltih, S.A. (1993). Pioneers in Food Science, Volume 1: Samuel Cate Prescott - M.I.T. Dean and Pioneer Food Technologist. Trumball, CT: Food & Nutrition Press.
Goldblith, S.A., B.E. Proctor, J.R. Hogness, and W.H. Langham (1949). "The Effect of Cathode Rays Produced at 3000 Kilovolts on Niacin Tagged with C14." Journal of Biological Chemistry. 179(3):1163-1167.

References
"In Memoriam: Samuel A. Goldblith." Food Technology. February 2002: pp. 14, 78.

External links

MIT Biography of Goldblith
Samuel Goldblith Memorial Service at MIT
List of IFT past award winners
List of IFT Fellows

American food scientists
Jewish American scientists
Fellows of the Institute of Food Technologists
Massachusetts Institute of Technology School of Science faculty
Massachusetts Institute of Technology School of Science alumni
United States Army officers
United States Army personnel of World War II
Bataan Death March prisoners
Recipients of the Silver Star
Members of the Royal Swedish Academy of Engineering Sciences
People from Lawrence, Massachusetts
American people of Russian-Jewish descent
World War II prisoners of war held by Japan
1919 births
2001 deaths
20th-century American Jews
Military personnel from Massachusetts